Guilford Court House, North Carolina, was the county seat of Guilford County before being replaced by Greensboro in 1808. It no longer exists as an identifiable community, having been absorbed by Greensboro. In 1781, it was the site of the Battle of Guilford Court House, which is now commemorated at Guilford Courthouse National Military Park. The Battle was between the Continental Army under general Nathanael Greene and the British Army under general Charles Cornwallis. The battle resulted in a British victory, but Greene's forces inflicted heavy casualties on Cornwallis' forces.

Geography of Guilford County, North Carolina
Landmarks in North Carolina